FR32 is the fourth studio album by British musician Wretch 32. It was released on 13 October 2017 through Polydor Records. It features Kojo Funds, Avelino whom Wretch previously collaborated on a mixtape titled Young Fire, Old Flame released in 2015. The album’s lead single "Tell Me" features Kojo Funds and Jahlani.

Track listing

Charts

References

2017 albums
Wretch 32 albums
Polydor Records albums